Charlotte Southern Rail Road is a short line railroad operating in Michigan.  It connects Charlotte, Michigan, with the CN rail system. It is a freight system, but its main customer has not received rail traffic since the early 2000s. It is operated by the Adrian and Blissfield Rail Road Company.

Dinner Train 
The railroad hosts the Old Road Dinner train.

Equipment
The railroad uses a GE 44-ton switcher for the Old Road Dinner train and any freight operations. This locomotive was the last 44-ton locomotive ever built. The railroad uses three passenger cars for the dinner train, and has two more stored at the end of the line.

References

Michigan railroads
Railway companies established in 1999
1999 establishments in Michigan